The men's javelin throw event was part of the track and field athletics programme at the 1948 Summer Olympics. The competition was held on August 4.  The final was won by Tapio Rautavaara from Finland.

Records
Prior to the competition, the existing World and Olympic records were as follows.

Schedule

All times are British Summer Time (UTC+1)

Results

Qualifying round

Qual. rule: qualification standard 64.00m (Q) or at least best 12 qualified (q).

Final

References

Sources
Organising Committee for the XIV Olympiad, The (1948). The Official Report of the Organising Committee for the XIV Olympiad. LA84 Foundation. Retrieved 5 September 2016.

Athletics at the 1948 Summer Olympics
Javelin throw at the Olympics
Men's events at the 1948 Summer Olympics